Alex Davidson (6 June 1920 – 11 February 2005) was a Scottish football player. Davidson played for Hibernian in the Scottish Football League before the Second World War. He scored a late equalising goal in an Edinburgh derby against Hearts on 1 January 1938. During the war, he played for Lincoln City as a guest. When league football resumed after the war, Davidson played for Chelsea and Crystal Palace in the English Football League.

References

External links 

Alex Davidson at holmesdale.net

1920 births
2005 deaths
People from Langholm
Scottish footballers
Association football inside forwards
Scottish Football League players
English Football League players
Hibernian F.C. players
Chelsea F.C. players
Crystal Palace F.C. players
Lincoln City F.C. wartime guest players
St Roch's F.C. players